Biola University is a private, nondenominational, evangelical Christian university in La Mirada, California. It was founded in 1908 as the Bible Institute of Los Angeles. It has over 150 programs of study in nine schools offering bachelor's, master's, and doctoral degrees. The university hosts the annual Missions Conference, the largest annual missions conference and the second-largest missions conference in the world. It has also played a significant role in the development of intelligent design.

History 

Biola University was founded in 1908 as the Bible Institute of Los Angeles by Lyman Stewart, president of the Union Oil Company of California; Thomas C. Horton, a Presbyterian minister and author; and Augustus B. Prichard, also a Presbyterian minister.

In 1912, the institute appointed R. A. Torrey as dean, and in 1913 began construction on a building at the corner of Sixth and Hope St. in downtown Los Angeles, which included a 3,500-seat auditorium, two large neon signs (added later) on top of the building proclaiming "Jesus Saves", and a carillon of 11 bells on which hymns were played three times each day. The early leaders wanted the institute to focus on training students in the Bible and missions rather than the broad approach to Christian education typical of Christian liberal arts colleges. The institute offered a diploma after completion of a two-year curriculum. This model was based largely on the Moody Bible Institute. Beginning in the 1920s, attempts were made to broaden the curriculum, but it was not until 1949 that the institution took the name "Biola College" and in 1981 was renamed "Biola University". Biola had re-located to La Mirada, California in 1959.

In 1915, Torrey announced plans to organize an independent church that would meet in Biola's auditorium called the Church of the Open Door. This decision proved controversial with local Presbyterian and Baptist clergy.

In 1917, the institute published a four-volume version of The Fundamentals: A Testimony To The Truth, a series of essays affirming conservative Protestant beliefs, edited by Torrey and others, with funds donated by Lyman Stewart and his brother Milton.

As of 1925, John Murdoch MacInnis was the school's second dean. He was a Presbyterian minister who had been an instructor at the school for about two years. MacInnis served as dean until his forced resignation on December 31, 1928. His administration had been turbulent. In 1927, Biola published a book by MacInnis entitled Peter the Fisherman Philosopher, which became the focus of an intense national controversy in which MacInnis was accused by fundamentalists of advocating liberal theological positions. Eventually, MacInnis was forced to resign, and all remaining copies of the book, along with the printing plates, were destroyed.

In 1929, Charles E. Fuller a businessman, evangelist, and graduate of Biola, was drafted as vice president to find a new dean and a president. Elbert McCreery and William P. White, both associated with Moody Bible Institute, were chosen to fill these posts.

During the Great Depression, the institute suffered serious financial difficulties. In 1932, Louis T. Talbot, pastor of the Church of the Open Door, assumed the presidency and helped raise much-needed funds. During the next two decades, Talbot led a shift away from missions, instead concentrating on academic programs. Talbot Theological Seminary became Biola's first graduate school and in 1977, Biola acquired the graduate programs of Rosemead Graduate School of Professional Psychology and relocated them to the La Mirada campus. Biola added a School of Intercultural Studies in 1983, through funds from the abandoned property of the Hunan Bible Institute in China, a School of Business in 1993, and a School of Education in 2007.

Presidents
William P. White (1929–1932)
Louis T. Talbot (1932-1935)
Paul W. Rood (1935–1938)
Louis T. Talbot (1938–1952)
Samuel H. Sutherland (1952–1970)
J. Richard Chase (1970–1982)
Clyde Cook (1982–2007)
Barry Corey (2007– )

Conferences 

Biola holds two annual student conferences, the Missions Conference during the spring semester and the Torrey Memorial Bible Conference during the fall semester.

The Torrey Memorial Bible Conference is also a three-day conference dedicated to students' spiritual growth. Every year, a specific topic is chosen that is geared towards the typical college student's spiritual needs.

The annual one-day Biola Media Conference seeks to advance the integration of faith and the arts. It brings together Christian media leaders and other Christians for education, inspiration, and networking.

On November 16, 1996, the university hosted the first national conference on intelligent design. Later, Intervarsity Press published Mere Creation, a collection of the papers presented at the conference. Subsequent intelligent-design conferences were held at the university in 2002 and 2004.

Since 2015, Biola requires students to attend five conference sessions and twenty chapel services per semester, or face a financial penalty.

Center for Messianic Jewish Studies
On October 8, 2007, Biola opened the Charles L. Feinberg Center for Messianic Jewish Studies in Manhattan. The center offers a master's degree in divinity in Messianic Jewish studies. The program, which is in cooperation with Chosen People Ministries, focuses on the education and training of leaders in the Messianic Jewish community. The program is approved by the New York State Board of Regents and the Association of Theological Schools.

Organization

Schools

Biola offers 47 undergraduate majors, 80 concentrations, and more than 150 professional fields of study. Degrees awarded include B.A., B.S., B.M., B.F.A., M.A., M.B.A., M.Div., Th.M., D.Min., D.Miss., Psy.D., Ed.D., and Ph.D. All are institutionally and professionally accredited and integrated with Christian doctrine.

The schools are:
 Crowell School of Business
 Rosemead School of Psychology
 School of Fine Arts and Communication
 School of Humanities and Social Sciences
 School of Education
 Cook School of Intercultural Studies
 Talbot School of Theology
 School of Science, Technology and Health
 School of Cinema and Media Arts

Crowell School of Business is an undergraduate and graduate business school located in La Mirada, California, at Biola University. In 1993, the school was established as the fifth school of Biola University. In 2005, the school was renamed the Crowell School of Business after a donation from the Crowell family, who has deep ties to the history of Biola University. The late Donald Warren Crowell was the great-nephew of Lula Crowell, wife of Biola co-founder Lyman Stewart. The new building opened in 2007 to host both graduate and undergraduate classes.

Crowell offers a Master of Business Administration (MBA) and a Masters in Professional Accountancy (MPAcc), both of which can be obtained through a full-time or part-time schedule. Both programs are accredited through the Western Association of Schools and Colleges; the MBA program is also accredited by the Accreditation Council for Business Schools and Programs. The undergraduate program at Crowell offers majors in accounting and in business administration with emphasis in international business, management, marketing, marketing management and business analytics. The school offers a minor in business administration available to all undergraduates at Biola University. The undergraduate program boasts approximately four hundred students, making it the largest undergraduate program at Biola.

The School of Education was established in 2007, originally started as the Education Department in 1952. It offers biblically integrated courses and programs that exist to train those who desire to make an impact as educators and administrators in public, private, homeschool, charter and international schools. At the undergraduate level, the School of Education is home to the elementary education, multidisciplinary majors and liberal studies, which consistently rank among the most popular undergraduate majors at Biola. At the graduate level, the School of Education offers Master of Arts in Teaching and Master of Arts in Education programs, which can be tailored to meet the individual interests of new and experienced teachers alike. The School of Education also offers a state-accredited teacher preparation program, which offers teaching credentials at both the graduate and undergraduate levels.

All undergraduate students are required to take 30 units of Bible classes, regardless of their major, resulting in a minor in theological and biblical studies. The mission of Biola University is "biblically centered education, scholarship, and service—equipping men and women in mind and character to impact the world for the Lord Jesus Christ."

In its 2017 college rankings, U.S. News & World Report ranked Biola in its "Best National Universities" category, ranking Biola 159 out of 311 national universities. Biola was one of only two national universities in the Council for Christian Colleges and Universities (CCCU) to be included in the first tier. In 2013 Biola was listed as one of nineteen "up-and-coming" national universities by U.S. News. In 2017 Niche ranked Biola as #33 of 364 best Christian colleges in America and #11 of 90 safest college campuses in California.

Honors program
Torrey Honors College, formerly Torrey Honors Institute, is a classical literature great books program started by Dr. John Mark Reynolds in 1995 and named after Reuben Archer Torrey. Classes in the department are used to meet most of the general education requirements at Biola University in four years; the program does not offer a major or minor. The Torrey Honors College is patterned after the Oxford tutorial system, employing reading, discussion, writing, mentoring, and lectures among other opportunities. The goal of the department is to "equip men and women to pursue truth, goodness and beauty in intellectual and spiritual community, enabling them to be strong Christian leaders."

Student organizations 
Biola has over 65 student organizations and clubs. The most prominent are the Student Government Association and the Student Missionary Union.

Biola's Student Government Association (SGA) equips student leaders to advocate for the student experience by funding student initiatives and representation for the undergraduate student body in order to foster Christ-centered community. SGA also sponsors student-initiated and student-run clubs on campus through which anyone can get involved, create community, and develop teamwork and leadership skills. There are more than 40 active clubs on campus.

The Biola Student Missionary Union (SMU) is the largest student-led missions organization in the United States. The ministry focuses in three primary areas: Biola, our city, and the Nations. Students from every background and skill set can live out the Great Commission in their lives through the Missions Conference, Local Missions trips (Jerusalem and Judea project), Short-Term Missions trips and many other opportunities. SMU exists to mobilize students to align their lives towards the completion of the Great Commission. Their desire is to consistently raise up generations of student leaders who passionately and obediently serve Jesus throughout their lives.

In May 2012, an underground LGBTQ community, calling themselves the Biola Queer Underground, launched a website in support of promoting dialogue and reconsideration of Biola's expulsion policy regarding homosexual behavior. The covert group requested to be accepted as a facet of diversity within the campus, declaring that, despite traditional church teaching on homosexuality, they held similar Christian beliefs and values to the university. The website was advertised on campus without authorization, and garnered national attention from the mainstream media. The Biola administration released a formal statement on their views on human sexuality shortly afterwards, and gave a chapel message reiterating their view that marriage is strictly between a man and woman. In the Spring of 2013, William Haggerty and Natasha Magness, both former students of the university, were interviewed by Biola's student newspaper, revealing that they were the co-founders of the organization.

Since then, The Dwelling, a university-sanctioned LGBTQ organization, has been established. It seeks to support LGBT students without endorsing same-sex marriage and related policies.

Athletics 

The Biola athletic teams are called the Eagles. The university is a member of the Division II level of the National Collegiate Athletic Association (NCAA), primarily competing in the Pacific West Conference (PacWest) since the 2017–18 academic year; while its men's and women's swimming & diving teams compete in the Pacific Collegiate Swim and Dive Conference (PCSC). They were also a member of the National Christian College Athletic Association (NCCAA), primarily competing as an independent in the West Region of the Division I level. The Eagles previously competed in the Golden State Athletic Conference (GSAC) of the National Association of Intercollegiate Athletics (NAIA) from 1994–95 to 2016–17.

Biola competes in 18 intercollegiate varsity sports: Men's sports include baseball, basketball, cross country, soccer, swimming, tennis, track & field and water polo; while women's sports include basketball, cross country, golf, soccer, softball, swimming, tennis, track & field, volleyball and water polo. Former sports included men's golf and men’s wrestling.

Hall of Fame
In 2012, Biola inducted three alumni into Inaugural Athletics Hall of Fame. The athletics department inducted Todd Worrell (baseball), Becky White (volleyball and women's basketball) and Wade Kirchmeyer (men's basketball). The school has since inducted 14 more alumni, including: Jim Blagg, Dr. Clyde Cook, Musa Dogonyaro, Ronn Johnson, Natasha Miller, Ben Orr, Jessica Pistole, Rianne Schorel and Tim Worrell.

Club sports
Biola also has a club men's lacrosse team that competed in the Western Collegiate Lacrosse League (W 

L)C), but since, they compete in a new conference, the Southwestern Lacrosse Conference (SLC). A club women's lacrosse team began competition in 2012 in the Western Women's Lacrosse League (WWLL). Biola also has a club men's rugby team that began playing in the SCRFU in 2013.

Move to NCAA Division II
On July 20, 2016, Biola University's application for membership into the NCAA Division II had been approved for the three-year membership process. The Eagles continued as an active member of the GSAC and the NAIA for the 2016–17 school year while completing Provisional Year One with the NCAA. In Provisional Year Two (2017–18), Biola joined the PacWest Conference and competed primarily against NCAA opponents. With successful completion of Provisional Year Three (2018–19) of the membership process, the Eagles will gain full, active NCAA D-II membership and become eligible to compete for NCAA Division II championships beginning as early as 2019–20.

Centers 
Biola has four university centers:

 Center for Christian Thought
 Center for Christianity, Culture and the Arts
 Center for Marriage and Relationships
 Center for the Study of the Work and Ministry of the Holy Spirit Today

In 2012, the Biola University Center for Christian Thought (CCT) was launched, funded by a $3.03 million grant from the John Templeton Foundation, the largest academic grant ever awarded to Biola University. The CCT is a forum where leading Christian thinkers from around the world gather to research and discuss issues of significance to the academy, the church, and the broader culture. In 2013, the Biola University Center for Christianity, Culture and the Arts (CCCA) was launched, funded with a grant from philanthropists Howard and Roberta Ahmanson's Fieldstead and Company. The CCCA sponsors events and symposia, produces online resources and strives to facilitate thoughtful reflection on the interplay of Christian faith, the larger culture and the world of the arts. In October 2014, Biola launched the Center for Marriage and Relationships (CMR). The center exists to build and sustain healthy relationships and marriages in the church and broader culture. In Fall of 2017, Biola launched the Center for the Study of the Work and Ministry of the Holy Spirit Today, funded by a $3 million donation. Located within Talbot School of Theology, the center is a 10-year initiative that provides resources for students and scholars.

Publications 
The university has been involved in the publication of the following magazines and academic journals:
The King's Business was a monthly publication of Biola from 1910 to 1970. In the first decades of its publication, it was the leading journal for conservative Christianity and the early fundamentalist movement. In fact, The Fundamentals and The King's Business shared the same chief editor (R. A. Torrey) and were supported by the same "concerned laymen" (Lyman and Milton Stewart).
Philosophia Christi is a peer-reviewed journal published twice a year by the Evangelical Philosophical Society with the support of Biola University as a vehicle for the scholarly discussion of philosophy and philosophical issues in the fields of ethics, theology, and religion. The journal is indexed by The Philosopher's Index and Religious & Theological Abstracts.
Journal of Psychology and Theology has as its purpose to communicate recent scholarly thinking on the interrelationships of psychological and theological concepts, and to consider the application of these concepts to a variety of professional settings. The major intent of the editor is to place before the evangelical community articles that have bearing on the nature of humankind from a Biblical perspective.
Journal of Spiritual Formation and Soul Care has as its purpose advancing the discussion of the theory and practice of Christian formation and soul care for the sake of the educational ministries of the church, Christian education, and other para-church organizations through scholarly publications that are rooted in Biblical exegesis, systematic theology, the history of Christian spirituality, philosophical analysis, psychological theory/research, spiritual theology, and Christian experience.
Christian Education Journal has as its purpose to strengthen the conception and practice of Christian education in church and para-church settings.
Great Commission Research Journal is a peer-reviewed journal devoted to research and scholarly thinking on church growth.
Biola Magazine is the official magazine of Biola University.
Talbot Magazine is the official magazine of Talbot School of Theology.
The Chimes is Biola's student newspaper.
The Point is a magazine produced by Biola's journalism program that won the 2008 Associated Collegiate Press Pacemaker Award, the highest honor for a collegiate magazine.
The Inkslinger is a student creative arts journal.
The Bells is a humorous, fictitious news site created by and for Biola students. The Bells is a satire similar to The Onion.
Open Biola is an online database allowing visitors from anywhere in the world to easily search, stream, download and share videos and other learning materials that engage academic topics from a Christian perspective.

Notable alumni

Steve Bridges (1986) – Comedian, impressionist, and actor
Clyde Cook (1957) – Missionary, professor, and university president
Scott Derrickson (1990) – Director, screenwriter and producer
Sikhanyiso Dlamini (2010) – Princess of Eswatini
Charles E. Fuller (1921) – Christian clergyman and radio evangelist
Judith Hill (2006) – Singer-songwriter
Dick Hillis (1932) –  Missionary and missions executive 
Michael Horton (1985) – Theologian and academic 
Mark Joseph (1990) – Producer and author
Zach King (2012) – Filmmaker and YouTube personality
Josh McDowell (1971) – Christian apologist, evangelist, and writer
Harold A. Netland - Philosopher and academic 
Trevor Oaks – Professional baseball player
Nabeel Qureshi (2008) – Author and Christian apologist
Cassie Randolph (2016) – Television personality and winner of The Bachelor
Tobin Sorenson (1980) – Mountain climber
John Thune (1983) – U.S. Senator from South Dakota since 2005 and Republican Whip since 2019
Larry Tieu (2007) – Professional basketball player
Tim Worrell (1990) – Former professional baseball player
Todd Worrell (1982) – Former professional baseball player
Danny Yamashiro (1991) – Chaplain at Massachusetts Institute of Technology (MIT), researcher on American presidents and childhood trauma, and media talk show host
Kristina Karamo (2020) - Leader of the Michigan Republican Party, former candidate for 2022 Michigan Secretary of State and proponent of Demonic Possession Transmission via STD

Notable current and previous faculty 

Clinton E. Arnold, New Testament scholar and Dean of Talbot School of Theology
Christopher Castile, Adjunct Professor of Political Science
William Lane Craig, Research Professor of Philosophy
J. Vernon McGee, Professor of Bible and Department Chair
J. P. Moreland, Distinguished Professor of Philosophy
Scott B. Rae, Old Testament scholar and Dean of the Faculty of Talbot School of Theology
Bernard Ramm, Baptist theologian and apologist
Robert L. Saucy, Distinguished Professor of Systematic Theology
J. Warner Wallace, Adjunct Professor of Apologetics

References

External links

 
 Official athletics website

 
Universities and colleges in Los Angeles County, California
Educational institutions established in 1908
Schools accredited by the Western Association of Schools and Colleges
Education in La Mirada, California
Evangelicalism in California
1908 establishments in California
Council for Christian Colleges and Universities
Nondenominational Christian universities and colleges in the United States
Private universities and colleges in California